Avinger may refer to:

Avinger, Texas, a town in Cass County, Texas, United States

People with the surname
Butch Avinger (1928–2008), American football player
Thomas Avinger (1928–2000), American composer, conductor and systems analyst